Julie Kent (born Julie Cox, 1969) is an American ballet dancer; she was a principal dancer with the American Ballet Theatre from 1993 to June 2015. In 2016, she was named the artistic director of The Washington Ballet. She is scheduled to become a co-artistic director at the Houston Ballet, starting in July 2023.

Early life
She was born Julie Cox in Bethesda, Maryland. Her father was a nuclear physicist and her mother, who is from New Zealand, was a ballet dancer and later flight attendant. She started ballet at age eight. She trained with  Hortensia Fonseca at the Academy of the Maryland Youth Ballet. She also spent summers attending intensives at American Ballet Theatre II and School of American Ballet. She took the stage name Julie Kent at the suggestion of Mikhail Baryshnikov.

Career

Kent joined the American Ballet Theatre in 1985, as an apprentice. The following year, she competed at the Prix de Lausanne, and was the only American to win any medal that year. Later that year, she became a member of the corps de ballet. In 1990, Kent was promoted to soloist. In 1993, she was named principal dancer, she also became the first American to win the Erik Bruhn Prize that year. In 2000, she received the Prix Benois de la Danse, and is the first American to win the prize.

Throughout her dance career, she has danced works by Marius Petipa, George Balanchine, Jerome Robbins, Frederick Ashton, Kenneth MacMillan and John Cranko. She has created roles in works by John Neumeier, Twyla Tharp, Alexei Ratmansky, Nacho Duato and Stanton Welch. She has made guest appearances in Russia, Italy, Germany, Australia, Argentina and Chile. Kent was one of José Manuel Carreño's partners in Swan Lake, his farewell performance, with Kent as Odette and Gillian Murphy as Odile.

In 2015, Kent retired from dancing. Her farewell performance was Romeo and Juliet, with Roberto Bolle as her Romeo. Having danced with ABT for 29 years, she is the longest-serving principal dancer in the company's history.

Following her retirement, she became the artistic director of ABT's summer program, with over 1,000 students training in various locations across the country.

In March 2016, The Washington Ballet announced Kent would assume the role of artistic director, succeeding Septime Webre. During her tenure, she has commissioned 26 new works, including works by Gemma Bond and Ethan Stiefel. She also staged The Sleeping Beauty alongside Victor Barbee. In October 2022, it was announced that Kent is set to leave Washington Ballet at the end of the 2022-23 season. She is scheduled to become an artistic director at the Houston Ballet, alongside current artistic director Stanton Welch, effective in July 2023.

Selected repertoire
Kent's repertoire with the American Ballet Theatre includes:

Awards
First place in the regional finals of the National Society of Arts and Letters, 1985
A medal at Prix de Lausanne, 1986
Erik Bruhn Prize, 1993 - first American winner
Prix Benois de la Danse, 2000 - first American winner
Honorary Doctorate of Performing Arts from the University of North Carolina School of the Arts, 2012
Lifetime Achievement Award from Dance Magazine, 2012
Source:

Film appearances
Along with Mikhail Baryshnikov, she starred in Herbert Ross' 1987 film Dancers. She was chosen after Baryshnikov saw her audition for ABT.

In Nicholas Hytner's 2000 film Center Stage she played principal dancer Kathleen Donahue, with original choreography by Susan Stroman. The film also stars her ABT colleagues Ethan Stiefel and Sascha Radetsky.

Personal life
Kent is married to Victor Barbee, former ABT Principal Dancer and Associate Artistic Director and currently The Washington Ballet Associate Artistic Director. They are the parents of two children.

References

External links 
 

1969 births
American ballerinas
American Ballet Theatre principal dancers
American people of New Zealand descent
Living people
People from Bethesda, Maryland
Prima ballerinas
Prix Benois de la Danse winners
School of American Ballet alumni
20th-century American ballet dancers
21st-century American ballet dancers
Artistic directors
21st-century American women